The Grane is a river of Lower Saxony, Germany. It is a right tributary of the Innerste river near Goslar.

It rises in the vicinity of Hahnenklee in the Upper Harz and discharges about  later into the Innerste near Langelsheim.

See also
List of rivers of Lower Saxony

References

Rivers of Lower Saxony
Rivers of the Harz
Rivers of Germany